Alain Behi (born 1 July 1978) is a French-Ivorian retired professional footballer who played as a midfielder.

Club career
Behi played several years for French Ligue 2 side Châteauroux before moving on to play in the Belgium Jupiler League with RAEC Mons. He got to play 21 league games, scoring one goal in the 2004–05 season, but the club was relegated. He played 14 second level games in the 2005–06 season.

Behi signed a -year deal with Greek top-flight club Kallithea F.C. in January 2006, but moved on to the Greek second level side PAS Giannina, after Kallithea had also suffered relegation. Following a dispute about his contract at PAS Giannina, he left the club.

Behi was handed a successful trial at Danish Randers FC. He joined the club as they needed a defensive midfielder. He failed to achieve a regular place in the starting eleven only playing a few times. In the 2007–08 season he ruined Randers' chance of leading the fair play competition (for teams not already qualified for European competitions) completely by getting two yellow cards and thereby a red card against later relegated side Lyngby BK - a competition FC Nordsjælland later entered the UEFA Cup through. Although being one of Randers' most expensive players, Behi did not play a big part in Randers' success in the start of the 2008–09 season (having seven points after three matches) not having played single match as a starter and only being put on as a late substitute. Behi received further competition with a comeback of former Danish under-21 international Jonas Damborg from a long term injury and Swedish Bobbie Friberg da Cruz joining the team in the winter break.

He played for Ashford Town F.C. (Middlesex) in the Isthmian League Premier Division, returning to France at the end of the 2010–11 season.

References

External links
 
 

1978 births
Living people
Footballers from Abidjan
Association football midfielders
French footballers
Ivorian footballers
Ivory Coast international footballers
Catania S.S.D. players
LB Châteauroux players
R.A.E.C. Mons players
PAS Giannina F.C. players
Kallithea F.C. players
Randers FC players
Serie B players
Ligue 2 players
Belgian Pro League players
Challenger Pro League players
Danish Superliga players
Ashford Town (Middlesex) F.C. players
French expatriate footballers
Ivorian expatriate footballers
French expatriate sportspeople in Belgium
Ivorian expatriate sportspeople in Belgium
Expatriate footballers in Belgium
French expatriate sportspeople in Denmark
Ivorian expatriate sportspeople in Denmark
Expatriate men's footballers in Denmark
French expatriate sportspeople in England
Ivorian expatriate sportspeople in England
Expatriate footballers in England